or  is an island in Tromsø Municipality in Troms og Finnmark county, Norway. It lies in the Tromsøysundet strait between the mainland and the larger island of Kvaløya. The city of Tromsø is located on the  island, which has 39,882 residents. The island is connected to the Tromsdalen area on the mainland to the east by the Tromsø Bridge and Tromsøysund Tunnel, and to the village of Kvaløysletta on Kvaløya island to the west by the Sandnessund Bridge.

Tromsø Airport is situated on the western side of the island. Prestvannet lake is located in the middle of the island, and the lake and the area around it is now a nature reserve area. The University of Tromsø, Tromsø police station, Tromsø fire station, University Hospital of North Norway, and Tromsø Museum are all located on the eastern part of the island.

References

External links 

 Google Maps satellite picture of Tromsøya

Tromsø
Islands of Troms og Finnmark